Kolucheh or Kallucheh or Kaloocheh or Kelucheh may refer to:
 Kolucheh, East Azerbaijan
 Kolucheh, Kermanshah
 Kolucheh, Kurdistan
 Kolucheh, Zanjan